The XV Eläintarhajot was a non-championship Formula Two motor race held at Eläintarha, Helsinki on 10 May 1953. The race was won by Rodney Nuckey in a Cooper T23-Bristol, starting from pole position. Roger Laurent was second in a Talbot-Lago T26C and Gunnar Carlsson third in a Ford Special.

Results

References

Eläintarhanajot
Eläintarhanajot
Eläintarhanajot